The men's 150m ind. medley SM3 event at the 2012 Summer Paralympics took place at the London Aquatics Centre on 2 September. There were two heats; the swimmers with the eight fastest times advanced to the final.

Results

Heats
Competed from 11:26.

Heat 1

Heat 2

Final
Competed at 20:01.

 
'Q = qualified for final. WR = World Record. EU = European Record. OC = Oceania Record.  DNS = Did not start.

References
Official London 2012 Paralympics Results: Heats 
Official London 2012 Paralympics Results: Final 

Swimming at the 2012 Summer Paralympics